Thrashers are a group of passerine birds related to mockingbirds and catbirds.

Thrasher may also refer to:

Music
"Thrasher", a song written and performed by Neil Young, featured on the 1979 album Rust Never Sleeps
"Thrasher", a song by Evile off of their 2007 album, Enter the Grave
"Thrasher", a song by Cavalera Conspiracy from their 2011 album Blunt Force Trauma
Someone who listens to Thrash metal music

Sports
Thrasher (magazine), an American skateboarding magazine
Thrasher Presents Skate and Destroy, a skateboarding video game
Thrasher (wrestler), a ring name of professional wrestler Glenn Ruth
The Atlanta Thrashers, a professional ice hockey team

Other uses
Thrasher (surname)
HMS Thrasher, several different ships
Thrasher (G.I. Joe), a fictional character in the G.I. Joe universe, member of the Dreadnoks
Colloquially, a thresher (threshing machine) or combine harvester, particularly an older one